Hugh Allen may refer to:

 Hugh Allen (politician) (1889–1972), member of the Legislative Assembly of Alberta, 1926–1935
 Hugh Allen (conductor) (1869–1946), English musician
 Hugh Allen (sailor) (1924–2013), Irish Olympic sailor
 St George Henry Rathborne (1854–1938), American author who wrote under this name
 Hugh Allen (bishop) (died 1572), Anglican bishop

See also
 Hugh Allan (disambiguation)